Yun Tong-hyon (Korean: 윤통현) is a North Korean general and politician. He is member of the Central Committee of the Workers' Party of Korea and member of the Supreme People's Assembly, North Korea's unicameral parliament.

Biography
He became a colonel-general in 2014 by order of the Supreme Commander of the Armed Forces of North Korea, Kim Jong-un. In 1998 and 2003 he was elected to the 10th and 11th convocations of the Supreme People's Assembly, respectively. In 2016, following the decisions made by the 7th WPK Congress, he was elected to the 7th Central Committee of the Workers' Party of Korea. In April 2019 he was elected to the 14th convocation of the Supreme People's Assembly, representing the Pongsusan (170th electoral district).

He was a member of the funeral committee of Kim Chol-man, Jon Pyong-ho, Kim Yang-gon, Ri Ul-sol, Kim Yong-chun. Following the death of Kim Jong-il in December 2011, he was also a member of his 232-members funeral committee.

Awards and honors 
A picture of Yun shows him wearing the ribbons to all decorations awarded to him.

References

North Korean generals
Workers' Party of Korea politicians
Members of the Supreme People's Assembly